Donald Davis (born 1944) is an American storyteller, author and minister.  Davis had a twenty-year career as a minister before he became a professional storyteller.  He has recorded over 25 storytelling albums and written several books. His long career as a teller and his promotion of the cultural importance of storytelling through seminars and master classes has led to Davis being dubbed the "dean of storytelling".

Background
Donald Davis was born in Waynesville, North Carolina, a small town in the mountainous region of Western North Carolina.  As a child, storytelling was a daily part of his family life.  "My grandmother did lots of telling," Davis recalled to the Winston-Salem Journal. "I remember hearing those stories, and I remember by the time I was in the second grade telling other kids in school stories I'd heard my grandmother tell."

He received a B.A. from Davidson College in 1966 and a Master of Divinity degree from Duke University Divinity School in 1969.  Davis served as a Methodist minister in High Point, North Carolina for over 20 years before retiring to become a professional storyteller.

Storytelling
Davis currently performs at storytelling festivals, schools and libraries across the country.   Past storytelling festival appearances include the Village of Tales Ojai Storytelling Festival in California, the Hoosier Storytelling Festival in Indianapolis, Indiana, the Southern Ohio Storytelling Festival, and the Colonial Williamsburg Storytelling Festival in Virginia.  He is also a regular performer at the National Storytelling Festival in Jonesborough, Tennessee.

Davis received the Circle of Excellence award in 1996 from the National Storytelling Network after being recognized by his peers as a master storyteller. He is the former Chair of the Board of Directors for the National Storytelling Association and has been a featured teller at the Smithsonian Institution and the World’s Fair.

Davis has appeared on National Public Radio, CNN and ABC's Nightline.  He also conducts seminars and master classes on storytelling throughout the United States.

Davis is a strong advocate of storytelling, not just the profession, but also storytelling in everyday life.  He feels that we connect with one another through the stories that we tell each other across the family dinner table or at a bar after work.  He believes that stories are really about identity, about who we are, and that technology may be all about moving information but it is in our stories that wisdom is passed down. He's best known for his stories in which balimp {this doesn’t seem to be a recognized word} happens.

Albums and books
Davis has recorded more than two dozen storytelling albums during approximately two decades. He considers himself to be primarily a storyteller, but Davis is also an author.  While the majority of his books are based on his recorded stories, he has also written a novel, a memoir and two educational books about storytelling and language.

Awards
His books and albums have won numerous awards including the South Carolina Middle-School Young Reader's Award, YALSA's Popular Paperback for Young Adults Award, Anne Izard Storyteller's Choice Award, Publishers Weekly Listen Up Award, AudioFile Earphones Award, Parents' Choice Award (Gold Title), and several Storytelling World Awards.

Personal life
Davis currently lives on Ocracoke Island on the Outer Banks of North Carolina.  He has three sons.  He usually wears a bow tie.

See also

Storytelling
Storytelling festival

References

External links
Official website
Biography, Awards and Appearance Schedule at August House
Interview of Davis for the Virginia Libraries

1944 births
Living people
People from Waynesville, North Carolina
American children's writers
American writers of young adult literature
20th-century American novelists
Methodist ministers
American storytellers
People from Ocracoke, North Carolina
21st-century American novelists
American male novelists
20th-century American male writers
21st-century American male writers